is a Public Library serving Nagoya, Aichi, Japan.

It is a central library of the  consisting of 20 buildings. It was established in 1923 but burned down in 1945 in the Second World War and reopened in 1952.  It is closed every Monday, unless that Monday is a national holiday, in which case the library is instead closed on the next weekday.  It is also closed on every third Friday of the month and for about a week for the Japanese New Year.

It is located in Tsuruma Park, close to Tsurumai Station on the subway and JR rail lines.

Name
Despite being located in an area called Tsurumai, the name of the library and the park that it is located in are named Tsuruma without an "i."  This is despite the fact that the place name "Tsurumai" and the library name "Tsuruma" are written the same way in Japanese in kanji.

See also
 Tsurumai Station

References

Tsuruma Park
Library buildings completed in 1952
Libraries in Nagoya
Public libraries
1923 establishments in Japan
Libraries established in 1923